Paul William McClellan, (born February 3, 1966) is a former American Major League baseball player for the San Francisco Giants.

McClellan, a graduate of Sequoia High School and the College of San Mateo.  He was a first round draft pick by the Giants in 1986.  He played his last game with the Giants on October 6, 1991.  His MLB career earned run average was 5.26.  Later, McClellan joined the now defunct Sonoma County Crushers minor league team which operated between 1995 through 2002.

References
 Paul McClellan profile provided by baseball-almanac.com
 Paul McClellan statistics provided by baseball-reference.com
 Paul McClellan statistics provided by thebaseballcube.com

1966 births
Living people
People from the San Francisco Bay Area
San Francisco Giants players
San Mateo Bulldogs baseball players
Major League Baseball pitchers
Baseball players from California
Algodoneros de Unión Laguna players
American expatriate baseball players in Mexico
Clinton Giants players
Denver Zephyrs players
Everett Giants players
Phoenix Firebirds players
Shreveport Captains players
New Orleans Zephyrs players
American expatriate baseball players in Italy
Nettuno Baseball Club players